Callibracon elegans is a species of wasp in the family Braconidae.

References

External links 

 

Braconinae
Insects described in 1901